Los Angeles FC (LAFC) is an American professional soccer club.

LAFC may also refer to the following association football clubs:

England
Liskeard Athletic F.C.
Liss Athletic F.C.
Lutterworth Athletic F.C.

Wales
Llanelli A.F.C.
Llangeinor A.F.C.
Llanwern A.F.C.

Scotland
Leith Athletic F.C.
Lochgelly Albert F.C.

Slovakia
FK LAFC Lučenec

Malta
Lija Athletic F.C.